Flavor Unit Entertainment is an American entertainment company originally launched in Jersey City, New Jersey, but is now based in Miami, Florida, United States. The company was founded by Queen Latifah and Shakim Compere in 1995.

The company produces films and television shows. In February 2013, Netflix signed an exclusive multi-year licensing deal with Flavor Unit Entertainment. Netflix will have its pick of movies produced by Flavor Unit Entertainment to debut on its streaming service.

In April 2014, Flavor Unit Entertainment entered into an exclusive programming partnership with Centric to re-brand the cable television channel as the first network designed for the black woman. The deal includes bringing Flavor Unit Entertainment's Single Ladies to Centric for a fourth season.

On April 26, 2017, MTV announced that they were rebooting the slasher television series Scream in its third season, with a new cast and setting. As part of the reboot process, it was revealed that Brett Matthews would be serving as the main showrunner. In addition, Brett Matthews, Latifah, Shakim Compere and Yaneley Arty were added as executive producers for the series under Flavor Unit Entertainment. The third season premiered on VH1 on July 8, 2019.

Filmography

Television

References

External links 
 

1995 establishments in New Jersey
American companies established in 1995
Companies based in Miami
Entertainment companies established in 1995
Film production companies of the United States
Privately held companies based in Florida
Television production companies of the United States